The 2005–06 season was Ergotelis' 76th season in existence, first season in the Greek Beta Ethniki following the club's relegation during last year's Alpha Ethniki, and 8th season overall in the competition. Ergotelis also participated in the Greek cup, entering the competition in the Third Round. The content of this article covers club activities from 1 June 2005 until 31 May 2006.

The club managed to win the Championship title for the first time in its history, thus achieving its first ever professional domestic title. Furthermore, Ergotelis impressed with their performance in the Greek Football Cup, where they managed to eliminate Greek giants Panathinaikos, advancing all the way to the competition's Round of 16 (fifth round) for the first time since the mid-80s.

Players

The following players have departed in mid-season

Out of Team 

Note: Flags indicate national team as has been defined under FIFA eligibility rules. Players and Managers may hold more than one non-FIFA nationality.

Transfers

In

Promoted from youth system

Total spending:  0,000 €

Out
 
Total income:  50,000 €
Expenditure:  50,000 €

Managerial changes

Kit
2005−06

|
|
|
|

Pre-season and friendlies

Pre-season friendlies

Mid-season friendlies

Competitions

Overview

Last updated: 24 April 2014

Beta Ethniki

League table

Results summary

Matches

Greek Cup

Third Round

Matches

Fourth Round

Matches

Round of 16

Matches

Statistics

Goal scorers

Last updated: 25 April 2014

References

Ergotelis
Ergotelis F.C. seasons